Gentianella germanica, common name German gentian, also known in the United Kingdom as the Chiltern gentian, is a flowering plant in the family Gentianaceae. It was chosen as the county flower of Buckinghamshire. Within the UK, it is only native to the Chiltern Hills of southern England, although its distribution in continental Europe is much wider, ranging from France to the Balkans.

References

germanica